Stephanie Alexander (born 1940) is an Australian chef.

Stephanie Alexander may also refer to:

Stephanie B. Alexander, American mathematician
Stevvi Alexander, American singer-songwriter